The 25th Golden Melody Awards were held in Taipei, Taiwan in 2014. The award ceremony for the popular music categories was broadcast on TTV on 28 June and was hosted by Harlem Yu.

Winners and nominees
Below is the list of nominees and winners. Winners are highlighted in bold.

Popular music categories

Song of the Year
 Hill (山丘) – Hill (山丘) – Jonathan Lee Battle Array Song (入陣曲) – The Best of 1999-2013 (步步自選作品輯) – Mayday
 Gypsy In Memory (流浪者之歌) – Songs of Transience (時間的歌) – Cheer Chen
 This Is Because We Feel Pain (這是因為我們能感到疼痛) – This Is Because We Feel Pain (這是因為我們能感到疼痛) – Tizzy Bac
 Sister (姐姐) – Sister (跳針舞曲2013) – Jeannie Hsieh

Best Mandarin Album
 I am Ayal Komod (我是海雅谷慕) – Chang Chen-yue Model (模特) – Li Ronghao (李榮浩)
 Classic (拾光) – Li Jian (李健)
 Recreate (你所不知道的杜振熙之內部整修) – Soft Lipa (杜振熙/蛋堡)
 Jianghu (江湖) – Wakin Chau

Best Taiwanese Album
 Sam Tsap Thong (30 出頭) – Chen Jian Wei (陳建瑋)Best Hakka Album
 Heart Land – Yachun Asta Tzeng (曾雅君)Best Aboriginal Album
 To & From the Heart (歌，飛過群山) –  Taiwu (泰武古謠傳唱)Best Female Mandarin Singer
 Penny Tai – Unexpected (純屬意外)
 Faith Yang – Zero
 Denise Ho – Coexistence (共存)
 Tanya Chua – Angel & Devil (天使與魔鬼的對話)
 JiaJia (紀家盈/家家) – Alone The Way (為你的寂寞唱歌)

Best Male Mandarin Singer
 JJ Lin – Stories Untold
 Li Ronghao (李榮浩) – Model (模特)
 Chang Chen-yue – I am Ayal Komod (我是海雅谷慕)
 Soft Lipa (杜振熙/蛋堡) – Recreate (你所不知道的杜振熙之內部整修)
 Wakin Chau – Jianghu (江湖)

Best Male Taiwanese Singer
 Chen Jian Wei (陳建瑋) – Sam tsap thong (30出頭)

Best Female Taiwanese Singer
 Huang Yee-ling (黃乙玲) – By Your Side (惦在你身邊)

Best Hakka Singer
 Yachun Asta Tzeng (曾雅君) – Heart Land

Best Aboriginal Singer
 Anu Kaliting Sadiponga (阿努．卡力亭．沙力朋安) – cepo’混濁了

Best Band
 Mixer (麋先生) – Circus Movement (馬戲團運動)
 ChthoniC (閃靈樂團） - Bu Tik　(武德)
 The Chairman (董事長樂團) - One Life (一條命)
 Fire EX. (滅火器) - Goodbye You!th
 Tizzy Bac - Fragile Objects (易碎物)
 Sodagreen (蘇打綠) - Autumn: Stories (秋：故事)
 Funky Brothers (放客兄弟) - Funky Brothers

Best New Artist
 Li Ronghao (李榮浩) – Model (模特)
 Jacky Chen (陳建瑋) - Sam Ts'ap Tho'ng (30 出頭)
 Simhanada (師子吼) - 1/84000
 Funky Brothers (放客兄弟) - Funky Brothers
 Xiao Ren (小人) -  Kiddo Kingdom (小人國)
 Koala Liu (劉思涵) - Embrace (擁抱你)

Best Group
 Light Engine (光引擎) – Scenes Along the Way (沿途風景)

Producer of the Year (Album)
 Penny Tai – Embrace You (擁抱你), released by Koala Liu (劉思涵)

Producer of the Year (Single)
 Jeffrey Kung (孔令奇), Derek Nakamoto – Old School (老派戀情), released by Jeffrey Kung (孔令奇)

Best Lyrics
 Jonathan Lee – Hill (山丘), sung by Jonathan Lee

Best Composition 
 Debbie Hsiao (蕭賀碩) – Musicians, sung by Shuo & Cool Humor
 Chang Chen-yue – Missed Call (未接來電), sung by Faith Yang 
 Tizzy Bac – This Is Because We Feel Pain (這是因為我們能感到疼痛), sung by Tizzy Bac
 Jonathan Lee – Hill (山丘), sung by Jonathan Lee
 Suming (舒米恩) – In a Rush (很趕), sung by Suming
 Penny Tai – Fortunate One (僥倖者), sung by Koala Liu (劉思涵)

Best Arrangement
 Zhao Zhao (趙兆) – Wind in the Rye (風吹麥浪), for Li Jian (李健)

Best Instrumental Album
 Tseng Tseng Yi (曾增譯) – Symbiosis (曾增譯共聲体三重奏)

Producer of the Year (Instrumental)
 Lu Sheng Wen (呂聖斐) and Dong Shun Wen (董舜文) – 4, released by Timeless Fusion Party (無限融合樂團)

Best Instrumental Composition 
 Tseng Tseng Yi (曾增譯) – Symbiosis (大稻晚霞)
 Tommy Fish (余昶賢) – Sunset On an Old City (共聲体) 
 Gu Zhongshan (顧忠山) – The Insigator (起哄者) 
 Ricky Ho (何國杰) – Abundance of Life (生命。樂章) 
 Baobu Badulu (保卜) – Signal Fire (狼煙)

Best Music Video
  Nan-hong Ho (何男宏) - Gypsy in Memory (流浪者之歌), sung by Cheer Chen

Best Album Design
  Yung-Chen Nieh (聶永真) - Hill (山丘), released by Jonathan Lee

Lifetime Contribution Award
 Peng Kuo-hua (彭國華)

Performers
Performers for the popular music category ceremony:

Presenters
Presenters for the popular music categories:

References

External links
  Official Website
  Official YouTube Channel

Golden Melody Awards
Golden Melody Awards
Golden Melody Awards
Golden Melody Awards
Golden Melody Awards